Frame (or "frAme")  is the seventh studio album by progressive metal Italian band DGM. It is the first album without lead vocalist Titta Tani. Mark Basile replaced Titta and took part in the album composition with producer/guitarist Simone Mularoni. The album was released on February 23, 2009, and its first single is "Hereafter".

Track listing
All music written by Mark Basile and Simone Mularoni.

Personnel

 Fabio Costantino – drums
 Andrea Arcangeli – bass
 Simone Mularoni – guitars, orchestration, producing, recording, mixing, mastering
 Emanuele Casali – keyboards, recording
 Mark Basile – vocals, final keyboard solo in Rest in Peace

Additional personnel
 Simone Bertozzi – growl vocals on No Looking Back
 Giuseppe "Dualized" Bassi – intro performing on Heartache
 Diego Reali – mid guitar solo on Heartache

References

2009 albums
DGM (band) albums
Scarlet Records albums